The Social Security Organization (SSO) is a social insurance organization in Iran which provides coverage of wage-earners and salaried workers as well as voluntary coverage of self-employed persons. In 1975, the laws Social Security Law was approved and the SSO was established.

Iran did not legislate in favor of a universal social protection, but in 1996, the Center for Statistics of Iran estimated that more than 73% of the Iranian population was covered by social security. Membership in the social security system is compulsory for all employees.

SSO is a non-governmental organization and it is solely financed by contributions (with the participation of insured (7%), employer (20–23%) and government (3%)). Social protection is extended to the self-employed workers, who voluntarily contribute between 12% and 18% of income depending on the protection sought. Civil servants, the regular military, Law Enforcement Force of the Islamic Republic of Iran, and the Islamic Revolutionary Guard Corps, Iran’s second major military organization, have their own pension systems.

Services
SSO provides the following services:
Retirement, disability and death;
Unemployment;
Old-age;
Helplessness, loss of caretaker and social vulnerabilities;
Accidents and injuries;
Physical, mental and psychic disability;
Health care and medical insurance;
Protecting mothers especially during the maternity period and child-rearing;
Protecting orphan children and unprotected women;
Planning particular insurance system for widows, old women and self-dependent women;
Poverty and inequity alleviation;
Assistance and rescue.

Statistics
Number of insured (18–65 years old): 12 million (2014)
Number of whole beneficiaries: 37 million (2014)
Retirees and beneficiaries: 2 million (old age, disabilities and survivors) (2013)

Affiliated institutions

The Social Security Investment Company (SSIC aka "SHASTA")
Sadere Tamin Company (Tile and Ceramic)
Tamin Chemical and Petrochemical Investment Company
Tamin Gas and Oil Investment Company
Tamin Pharmaceutical Investment Company
Tamin Nourishment Investment Company
Pars Hotels Investment Company
Saba Tamin Company
RighTel (Telecom)
Iran Khanesazi Investment Company (housing)
Refah Bank
The Tamin ICT & Management Consultancy Service Company
Social Security Auditing Company
Social Security Real Estate Agency
Kar & Tamin Company
Homa Hotel Group
The SSO Milad-e-Salamat Health and Medical Institute
Hekmat Medical Group Company (ltd.)

See also
Bonyad
Civil Servants Pension Organization
Economy of Iran
Iranian labor law
Ministry of Welfare and Social Security (Iran)
Taxation in Iran
Iran Technical and Vocational Training Organization

References

External links

U.S. Social Security Administration: Iran's entry (coverage details)

Society of Iran
Economy of Iran
Ministry of Cooperatives Labour and Social Welfare (Iran)